A hockey jersey is a piece of clothing worn by ice hockey, ringette, broomball, and spongee players to cover the upper part of their bodies. These jerseys are occasionally worn by North American bandy players as well as some rinkball players in Finland. This article deals chiefly with jerseys worn by ice hockey players.

In ice hockey, the jersey is traditionally called a sweater, terminology originating from the sport's earlier days when the game was predominantly played outside during winter and where the sweaters worn by players was a warm wool-knit covering.

Design 

Hockey jerseys, today often referred to as sweaters, are typically made of tough synthetic materials like polyester, to help take away moisture and keep the wearer dry. Most professional ice hockey teams sell replica sweaters of their famous players at sports memorabilia stores, as well as being available at arenas.

For most leagues around the world, in accordance with the team's colours and matching the socks, they are usually emblazoned with the team's logo on the front, the player's last name on the upper back, and a designated number below, from 0 to 99. A team captain wears an uppercase "C" above and to the right of the team logo on their sweaters (although a few NHL teams have the letter above and to the left). Two other players, designated alternate captains, wear an uppercase "A" on theirs.

Sweaters worn in European leagues and tournaments are adorned with sponsor advertisements, a concept borrowed from football jerseys. The NHL first allowed ads on jerseys in the 2022-23 season.

Exceptions
The design is often adapted for specific cases, such as former NHL Vancouver Canucks teammates Henrik and Daniel Sedin. Their last names are accompanied by their first initials, since being twin brothers they share the same last name on the same roster. Similarly, Aku and Aatu Räty wear jerseys with two letters from their first names when playing for the same team to distinguish them.

The National Hockey League no longer permits 0 nor 00 for jersey numbers, as they cannot be entered into the NHL's database, and the available numbers only go up to 98 since the League retired the number 99 in honor of Wayne Gretzky.

Cultural impact 
The cultural impact of the hockey sweater in Canada is encapsulated by the short story The Hockey Sweater by Roch Carrier. In it, a young hockey fan asks his mother to order a Montreal Canadiens sweater from an Eatons department store catalogue, but instead accidentally receives a sweater for the team's arch-rival, the Toronto Maple Leafs, much to his embarrassment and the derision from his friends. The story was later made into a short animated film of the same name, which was produced by the National Film Board of Canada; a quote from it appears on the Canadian five-dollar bill.

In the mid 1990's hockey jerseys became popular in Hip-Hop culture. The first major appearance is from Snoop Dogg in his Gin and Juice music video. In it he is seen wearing a Pittsburgh Penguins jersey with "Gin and Juice" and the number 94 on the back. In other scenes in the music video he is wearing Springfield Indians jersey. In an interview with the Athletic, when asked why he chose to wear them, Snoop Dogg responded "I always thought that the hockey jerseys were fashionable and a good fit. No one in rap was really reppin them."

Hockey Jerseys also appeared in multiple other music videos from artists such as Nas in "The World is Yours", A Tribe Called Quest in "Oh My God", LL Cool J in "Hey Lover", and Smif-N-Wessun in "BuckTown" and "Let's get it on." Tupac Shakur was seen wearing a Detroit Red Wings jersey in an infamous photo and video of him spitting at reporters while appearing to court.

See also
 Ice hockey equipment
 NHL uniform
 Barber's pole style sweaters

References 

"The Hockey Sweater"

External links 

World Hockey Association uniforms
National Hockey League uniforms

Ice hockey equipment
Sportswear